The 14817/18 Bhagat Ki Kothi - Bandra Terminus Express is an express train belonging to North Western Railway zone that runs between  and  in India.

It is currently being operated with 14817/18 train numbers on bi-weekly basis via .

Coach Composition

The train has standard ICF rakes with max speed of 110 km/h. The train consists of 17 coaches:

 1 AC II Tier
 2 AC III Tier
 6 Sleeper Coaches
 6 General Unreserved
 2 Seating cum Luggage Rake

Service

The 14817/Bhagat Ki Kothi - Bandra Terminus Express has an average speed of 46 km/h and covers 942 km in 20 hrs 30 mins.

The 14818/Bandra Terminus - Bhagat Ki Kothi Express has an average speed of 49 km/h and covers 942 km in 19 hrs 15 mins.

Route & Halts 

The important halts of the train are:

Schedule

Rake Sharing 

The train shares its rake with 14803/04 Bhagat Ki Kothi - Ahmedabad Weekly Express.

See also 

 Bhagat Ki Kothi - Ahmedabad Weekly Express

References 

Transport in Mumbai
Transport in Jodhpur
Express trains in India
Rail transport in Maharashtra
Rail transport in Gujarat
Rail transport in Rajasthan
Railway services introduced in 2019